Same-sex marriages are not performed in Aruba, Curaçao, or Sint Maarten, which are constituent countries of the Kingdom of the Netherlands. The islands were obliged after several court rulings to register any marriage (including same-sex marriages) registered in the Kingdom, but this primarily considers residency rights and they do not have to give same-sex marriages the same legal effect as opposite-sex marriages. Marriage in the European territory of the Netherlands, as well as in the Caribbean municipalities of Bonaire, Sint Eustatius and Saba, is open to any two people irrespective of sex.

Aruba has recognized registered partnerships providing almost all of the rights and benefits of marriage since September 2021. That same month, a lower court in Curaçao ruled that preventing same-sex couples from marrying violates the equality provisions of the Constitution of Curaçao, but left the decision of whether to legalise same-sex marriage up to the Parliament of Curaçao. In December 2022, the Joint Court of Justice of Aruba, Curaçao, Sint Maarten, and of Bonaire, Sint Eustatius and Saba ruled that Aruba's and Curaçao's same-sex marriage bans are unconstitutional. The court order was set to go into effect on 7 March 2023 pending an appeal to the Supreme Court of the Netherlands; both Curaçao and Aruba subsequently appealed.

Registered partnerships

Registered partnerships, offering several of the rights, benefits and obligations of marriage, have been recognized in Aruba for different-sex and same-sex couples since 1 September 2021.

In November 2015, Prime Minister Mike Eman promised to support bills legalizing registered partnerships for same-sex couples. On 8 September 2016, the Parliament of Aruba voted in favor of an amendment to the Aruban Civil Code legalizing registered partnerships for both same-sex and opposite-sex couples. The amendment gives couples in registered partnerships almost all of the rights offered to married couples, such as access to spousal pensions and the possibility to make emergency medical decisions for a partner. Governor Fredis Refunjol granted royal assent on 23 September 2016, and the law came into effect on 1 September 2021, after the government published a commencement order.

Following the passage of a registered partnership bill in Aruba, LGBT organizations in both Curaçao and Sint Maarten announced they were hopeful such laws would also be approved in their respective countries. After an amendment giving cohabiting couples, including same-sex couples, some limited legal rights was proposed in the Parliament of Curaçao in 2017, former Prime Minister Gerrit Schotte suggested that a referendum on the legalisation of same-sex marriage be held on the island, though no referendum was held.

Same-sex marriage

Aruba, Curaçao, and Sint Maarten have separate civil codes, in which marriage is defined as the union between a man and a woman. However, marriage licenses and other documents regarding civil status from elsewhere in the Kingdom (including the European and Caribbean parts of the country of the Netherlands) must be accepted by these constituent countries as a result of Article 40 of the Charter for the Kingdom of the Netherlands, and therefore registration of a same-sex marriage from the Netherlands is possible in all countries. Acceptance and registration of the same-sex marriage does not mean automatic equal treatment: if a facility (e.g. social benefits) is only open to married couples, this applies in certain cases only to heterosexual couples (the couples as defined in the civil codes of the countries). When a facility, however, is also open to non-married couples, then same-sex couples must also be included based on non-discrimination rules.

Case law
As the civil codes do not mention same-sex marriage, several court cases have given information on the status of same-sex marriages in the three islands. As the jurisprudence of the Kingdom is dependent on each other, decisions in other countries have in the same situation the same validity. Before the dissolution of the Netherlands Antilles, Curaçao and Sint Maarten were part of the latter country, and as such their civil codes are based on the Civil Code of the Netherlands Antilles. An overview of relevant cases is discussed below.

Recognition of Dutch marriages (2002–2007)
A case was launched in 2002 by a same-sex couple seeking recognition of their Dutch marriage in Aruba. Citing one of the partners' inability to receive health care benefits from the job of the other, as entitled to a spouse in a heterosexual marriage, they accused the Aruban Government of discrimination. The government was adamantly opposed to the court challenge. The couple reported that they often had rocks thrown at them, were suffering from depression and were residing in the Netherlands after leaving Aruba in November 2003 because of harassment when they tried to register as a married couple. In December 2004, the Aruba Court of First Instance ruled that their marriage should be registered in Aruba. The Aruban Government's stance was that the Civil Code of Aruba does not allow for same-sex marriage, and that it "goes against Aruba's way of life".

The government appealed the ruling to the Common Court of Justice of the Netherlands Antilles and Aruba (since 2010 the Joint Court of Justice of Aruba, Curaçao, Sint Maarten, and of Bonaire, Sint Eustatius and Saba). The court upheld the decision on 23 August 2005, stating that: "The Dutch marriage can be inscribed in the register. Since Aruba is part of the Kingdom of the Netherlands, it must comply with demands of the Kingdom." The ruling was based on Article 40 of the Charter of the Kingdom of the Netherlands which states that civil certificates are valid throughout the Kingdom. Aruban Prime Minister Nelson O. Oduber reacted to the decision by declaring, "We give neither legal nor moral recognition to same-sex marriages." The government appealed the ruling to the Supreme Court of the Netherlands. On April 13, 2007, the Supreme Court declared that, in accordance with the Charter, all marriages contracted in the different parts of the Kingdom of the Netherlands, must be accepted in the other parts of the Kingdom as well. It ruled that the matter that Aruba does not have a same-sex marriage law or that it "goes against Aruba's 'way of life'" was irrelevant to the issue. With this ruling, Aruba, as well as Curaçao and Sint Maarten, must recognize same-sex marriages performed in the Netherlands and the Caribbean Netherlands.

Same-sex divorce (2010)
In the case of a joint divorce request of a same-sex couple in Aruba, a court ruled in 2008 that even though same-sex marriages are not mentioned in the Civil Code of Aruba, the partners constituted a married couple and as such should be allowed to divorce.

Non-equal treatment of married couples (2008–2010)
In July 2008, the Netherlands Antilles Court of First Instance in Curaçao ruled against the Antillean Office for Healthcare Facilities (BZV; Stichting Bureau Ziektekostenvoorzieningen) for discriminating against a married lesbian couple. The court ruled that the office had acted illegally when it refused to register the couple in its health insurance scheme. The judgement of the ruling held that "the recognition of the marriage certificate also means the recognition of the legal consequences of the marriage certificate". The decision was overturned on appeal in June 2009 by the Common Court of Justice of the Netherlands Antilles and Aruba, which stated that although a same-sex marriage had to be registered as a marriage, this did not require organizations and agencies to give the same effect to them as other marriages. The court ruled similarly in June 2010 in a case involving the enrollment of a same-sex couple in a collective health insurance scheme, stating explicitly that enrollment to same-sex couples was only possible as enrollment was also open to non-married couples and thus excluding same-sex couples would constitute discrimination. If non-married couples were excluded, then there would be no obligation for same-sex couples to be included.

Discriminatory exclusion from marriage (2020–present)
On 27 May 2020, the Court of First Instance of Aruba ruled in Fundacion Orguyo Aruba (et al.) v. Country Aruba that the government was acting unlawfully by not offering an alternative to marriage for same-sex couples. The Fundacion Orguyo Aruba appealed parts of the court decision on 6 July 2020, arguing that same-sex couples should be allowed to marry instead of having access to an alternative partnership institution. Registered partnerships were legalized in Aruba in September 2021, but the case continued.

On 13 September 2021, the Court of First Instance in Curaçao found that the exclusion of same-sex couples from marriage was contrary to the equality principle of the Constitution of Curaçao, but left it to the Parliament to address the unlawful discrimination. "There is no justification to deny same-sex couples the right to get married, certainly as long as there is no comparable legal system such as a registered partnership", the court said. The case was filed by a lesbian couple who had been together for more than 10 years and sought the right to marry. The Human Rights Caribbean Foundation said the ruling was a "step forward" and an "asset to anyone who supports fundamental rights and is committed to equality". The government filed an appeal of the decision in June 2022, though Prime Minister Gilmar Pisas had announced immediately after the court ruling that it had plans to appeal.

The Joint Court of Justice of Aruba, Curaçao, Sint Maarten, and of Bonaire, Sint Eustatius and Saba ruled in both cases on 6 December 2022 that the same-sex marriage bans in Aruba and Curaçao were unconstitutional and that same-sex couples must be allowed to marry in those islands. The court ruled that "the fact that marriage is a centuries old tradition" does not justify differential treatment for same-sex couples, the argument that the legalization of same-sex marriages would "weaken marriage" was "objectively unjustified", and that registered partnerships are no acceptable alternative for same-sex couples as marriage carries "symbolic, emotional and intrinsic value" that offers "more protection and stability". The effect of the ruling was stayed until 7 March 2023 pending appeal to the Supreme Court of the Netherlands. State Secretary Alexandra van Huffelen said the ruling should also apply to Sint Maarten "as all three [islands] have the same legal framework".
The government of Curaçao announced its intention to file a cassation appeal on 13 December, followed by the Aruban government on 24 February.

Legislative action

Aruba
The opposition Accion 21 party introduced a bill to allow same-sex marriage to Parliament in June 2022.

Curaçao
In September 2018, three LGBT rights organizations presented a bill to legalize same-sex marriage in Curaçao to the Vice President of Parliament, Giselle McWilliam. McWilliam applauded the action saying, "I think it's great. It shows that democracy is alive on Curaçao. That initiatives can come not only from the parliament or the government, but also from the people themselves. Everyone has the right to submit a bill, I am going to do everything to help this group, because they are also part of it." Prime Minister Eugene Rhuggenaath also welcomed the measure, saying that it "is now time to debate the issue", and that "exclusion and discrimination against the LGBT community affects human rights." On 4 June 2019, the bill was submitted to Parliament by members of the Partido MAN and the Real Alternative Party, but it was withdrawn the following year due to lack of support.

Sint Maarten
Following the December 2022 court ruling that Aruba's and Curaçao's same-sex marriage bans were unconstitutional, :nl:Melissa Gumbs, a member of the Parliament of Sint Maarten, said her party was planning on introducing a same-sex marriage bill to Parliament, noting that "there is precedent now within the Caribbean part of the kingdom (of the Netherlands) that it's not right to withhold same-sex marriage rights from people."

Public opinion
Support for same-sex marriage in Aruba, Curaçao and Sint Maarten is significantly lower than in the country of the Netherlands. A 2019 Eurobarometer poll showed that 92% of people in the European Netherlands thought same-sex marriage should be allowed throughout Europe, while 8% were opposed. For comparison, a 2021 Aruban poll showed that 49% of respondents supported registered partnerships for same-sex couples, and 46% supported same-sex marriage. Support was higher among young people (about 75% of people under the age of 30 expressed support), and those who had completed higher education.

See also
 LGBT rights in Aruba
 LGBT rights in Curaçao
 LGBT rights in Sint Maarten
 Same-sex marriage in the Netherlands
 Recognition of same-sex unions in the Americas

Notes

References

External links
 Dutch & Arubans At Odds Over Gay Marriage by the Associated Press, August 2005

LGBT rights in Aruba
Aruba, Curaçao, and Sint Maarten
Aruba, Curaçao, and Sint Maarten
LGBT rights in Sint Maarten
LGBT rights in Curaçao
Same-sex marriage in North America